Grayson "The Professor" Scott Boucher (born June 10, 1984) is an American streetball player, actor, and former professional basketball player. He is most known for playing on the highly stylized, international AND1 Mixtape Tour; he has also appeared in several movies, Netflix’s Hustle and  Ball Don't Lie. Boucher is 5'10" and weighs 145 pounds (178 cm, 66 kg) and his jersey number is 12.

Boucher attended McNary High School but transferred to nearby Salem Academy where he made all-state honors. He was given no college offers in high school. After high school, Boucher attended Chemeketa Community College, where he played on the basketball team.

Professional career

Salem Stampede (2006) 
On February 9, 2006, Boucher signed with the Salem Stampede of the International Basketball League.

Atlanta Krunk (2007–2008) 
Boucher played for the Atlanta Krunk of the Continental Basketball Association during the 2007–08 season.

Street basketball career 
When the AND1 Mixtape Tour stopped in Portland, Oregon, Boucher and his brother attended as fans.  Boucher found out there was an "open run" tryout to join the tour, and earned a spot on the team. By summer 2009, Boucher was featured prominently in the tour's marketing, appearing on the main page of their website and in various advertisements.

He has played in over 30 countries and has been featured in seven seasons of Streetball on ESPN, five AND1 mixtape DVDs, four AND1 commercials, and an AND1 video game.

After leaving AND1 in January 2011, Boucher played streetball for Ball Up. He became acquainted with Ball Up's CEO, Demetrius Spencer, in late 2008. The Ball Up Tour features most of the players from the AND1 Mixtape Tour and focuses more on the on-the-court action, a departure from the AND1 tour, which featured more behind-the-scenes footage. The international tour stopped in over 10 countries, and had plans for a winter tour in the U.S.

Career statistics

CBA

Regular season 

|-
| style="text-align:left;"|2007–08
| style="text-align:left;"|Atlanta
| 13 || 5 || 20.7 || .429 || .444 || .333 || .8 || 2.3 || .9 || .0 || 4.5

Acting career
Boucher has used his status to appear in several films portraying basketball players. He appeared in the film Semi-Pro, starring Will Ferrell, as a point guard on the opposing squad in the final game of the movie, and was featured in the special features section of the DVD version as well. Boucher played the lead role of Sticky in the film Ball Don't Lie, based on the book of the same name. The film was completed and shown nationally at several film festivals but was never officially released.

Boucher also took on the role of Spider-Man in a YouTube web-series he created. In the series, he disguised himself as the superhero and went to various basketball courts in the Los Angeles area to play against unsuspecting competitors. The first episode reached 14 million views on YouTube within a week of being uploaded. It was featured on the ESPN website, and gained further attention from Shaquille O'Neal, who tweeted the video to his followers. The third episode featured NBA star Jamal Crawford, and further plans were made to feature other known basketball players. The fourth episode of the series featured another street basketball player, Larry "Bone Collector" Williams, who disguised himself as the popular Marvel Comics superhero Captain America. The sixth installment featured a basketball player disguised as Deadpool. The seventh part of series had a disguised Boucher facing off against another basketball player, disguised as Carnage.

Boucher also launched a ball-handling guide called Super-Human Dribbling, a web-based tutorial available for download online, that features Boucher's drills and workouts.

Boucher now has his own YouTube channel where he posts mixtapes of him playing in local basketball leagues, fun and comical videos, tutorials, and other entertaining basketball videos.

In April 2019, Boucher suffered a career-threatening non-contact total tear of his Achilles tendon. He also suffered from accidental overdose of hydrocodone and acetaminophen during the early stages of rehabilitation, but had made a full recovery as of June 2020.  During his rehab period, he continued to publish YouTube content consisting of undated footage from before the injury, choosing not to make news of the injury public until August 2020, after his recovery was complete.

Filmography

References

External links
 Streetball.com - videos, pictures, and news
 Official website
 
 
 
 

1984 births
Living people
AND1
Basketball players from Oregon
American men's basketball players
Junior college men's basketball players in the United States
People from Keizer, Oregon
Street basketball players
American male film actors